Amina is a 2012 Nigerian psychological drama film written, produced and directed by Christian Ashaiku, starring Omotola Jalade Ekeinde, Van Vicker and Alison Carroll. Amina was shot on location in London.

Cast
Omotola Jalade Ekeinde as Amina
Wil Johnson as Dr Johnson
Van Vicker| as Michael
Vincent Regan 
Alison Carroll as Lucy
Susan Mclean as Nurse

Reception
Amina received generally mixed to negative reviews; many critics criticized the casting of the film. NollywoodForever gave it a 45% rating, and also commented negatively about the casting.

See also
 List of Nigerian films of 2012

References

External links
 

2012 films
English-language Nigerian films
2010s psychological drama films
Films about psychiatry
Films set in England
Films shot in England
Nigerian drama films
2012 drama films
2010s English-language films